Events from the year 1772 in Scotland.

Incumbents

Law officers 
 Lord Advocate – James Montgomery
 Solicitor General for Scotland – Henry Dundas

Judiciary 
 Lord President of the Court of Session – Lord Arniston, the younger
 Lord Justice General – Duke of Queensberry
 Lord Justice Clerk – Lord Barskimming

Events 
 April–June – the brig Alexander collects emigrants from the west of Scotland (the "Glenaladale settlers") and carries them to Prince Edward Island. 
 10 June – Credit crisis of 1772 is triggered when, following the flight of their partner, Aberdeen-born Alexander Fordyce, to France, the London banking house of Neal, James, Fordyce and Down (which has been speculating in East India Company stock) suspends payment. The resultant panic causes failure of other banks, particularly in Scotland, and especially in Edinburgh and the Ayr Bank.
 Summer – Welsh naturalist Thomas Pennant makes a second tour of Scotland.
 Construction of St Andrew Square, Edinburgh, as the first part of the New Town (designed by James Craig), begins.
 Original North Bridge, Edinburgh, completed.
 Three Stirling councillors privately sign a secret agreement, the "Black Bond", to run the affairs of the burgh to their own personal advantage.
 Fingal's Cave is brought to the attention of the English-speaking world by English naturalist Sir Joseph Banks.

Births 
 15 January – James Ballantyne, editor and publisher (died 1833)
 11 February – Thomas Webster, geologist (died 1844 in London)
 8 June – Robert Stevenson, lighthouse engineer (died 1850)
 25 December – John Mackay, botanist (died 1802)

Deaths 
 26 July – James Graeme, poet (tuberculosis; born 1749)
 10 October – William Wilkie, poet (ague; born 1721)

The arts
 Lady Anne Lindsay writes the ballad "Auld Robin Gray".

See also 

Timeline of Scottish history

References 

 
Years of the 18th century in Scotland
Scotland
1770s in Scotland